Posyolok imeni Artyoma is a rural locality (a settlement) in Sergeikhinskoye Rural Settlement, Kameshkovsky District, Vladimir Oblast, Russia. The population was 366 as of 2010. There are 7 streets.

Geography 
The settlement is located 5 km west of Kameshkovo (the district's administrative centre) by road. Ostrov is the nearest rural locality.

References 

Rural localities in Kameshkovsky District